MacAdams Lake  is a community in the Canadian province of Nova Scotia, located in the Cape Breton Regional Municipality on Cape Breton Island.

References
MacAdams Lake on Destination Nova Scotia 

Communities in the Cape Breton Regional Municipality
General Service Areas in Nova Scotia